Thomas Henry Knibbs (died 21 August 1915) was an English amateur footballer who played in the Football League for Burton Swifts as an outside left.

Personal life 
Knibbs worked as an engine fitter and served as a private in the York and Lancaster Regiment during the First World War. He was killed during the Gallipoli Campaign on 21 August 1915 and is commemorated on the Helles Memorial.

References 

English footballers
British Army personnel of World War I
English Football League players
1915 deaths
Sportspeople from Burton upon Trent
British military personnel killed in World War I
Association football outside forwards
Burton Swifts F.C. players
Preston North End F.C. players
York and Lancaster Regiment soldiers
Year of birth unknown